Avner Halperin is an Israeli entrepreneur, EyeControl's  and EarlySense Chairman of the Board of Directors. He is also research fellow at Harvard Kennedy School, an adjunct professor at Tel Aviv University (teaching Big Data Economics), and leads global innovation initiatives for Sheba Medical Center.

Biography
Avner Halperin was born and raised in Jerusalem, Israel. He spent the last six years of his schooling in the United States, attending high school in Washington, D.C. After high school, he served in the IDF. He  earned a B.Sc. in physics from the Hebrew University of Jerusalem and, later, an M.Sc. in the subject from Tel Aviv University. He earned an MBA through the Sloan Fellows program at MIT, where his thesis documented the role of American CEOs in Israeli companies.

Business and academic career
Halperin worked in executive positions at Eldat Communications, Radcom, and Lenslet. He also served as the CEO of Emmunet, which he co-founded with Yossi Vardi. In 2004, he co-founded EarlySense, a medical technology company, with Yossi Gross, Guy Shinar, and Danny Lange.  He is an inventor of 34 U.S. patents many of which are associated with the non-contact medical detection and monitoring devices that the company produces (other patents cover wireless communications and cyber security solutions).

In 2016, Halperin was a member of the Israeli Economic Development Mission led by Governor Charlie Baker.

In 2020, Halperin appointed  EyeControl's chairman of the board of directors.

In addition, Halperin is adjunct professor at the Tel Aviv University and also lectures at the Hebrew University of Jerusalem and at numerous events including a TED Talk on Artificial Intelligence in Healthcare, the Calcalist Inspire Digital and Mobile conference, the American Heart Association's Heart and Stroke Innovation Forum, and CE Week.

Published works
 Comment on Compact short-wavelength free-electron laser, A. Gover and A. Halperin, Physical Review Letters 67, 1934, September 1991.
 Non-classical Effects in Smith-Purcell Radiation, Tel-Aviv University, 1993.
 Electron-beam-induced super-radiant emission from a grating, A. Halperin, A. Gover, and A. Yariv, Physical Review A 50, 3316, October 1994.
 Globally dispersed startups, A. Halperin, MIT, 2001.

References

External links
 Google Scholar - Avner Halperin
 

Year of birth missing (living people)
Living people
Israeli chief executives
Hebrew University of Jerusalem alumni
Academic staff of the Hebrew University of Jerusalem
Tel Aviv University alumni
MIT Sloan Fellows
MIT Sloan School of Management alumni